Band Kurai is a town and union council of Dera Ismail Khan District in Khyber Pakhtunkhwa province of Pakistan. It is located at 32°2'26N 70°54'12E and has an altitude of 182 metres (600 feet).

References

Union councils of Dera Ismail Khan District
Populated places in Dera Ismail Khan District